Temple Beth-El is a Reform Jewish synagogue in Alpena, Michigan.

The temple is located at 125 White Street in a vernacular style building built in 1889, making it one of America's relatively few surviving 19th century synagogues.

The congregation's archives are in the library of Wayne State University.

References

External links 

 

Reform synagogues in Michigan
Buildings and structures in Alpena County, Michigan
Synagogues completed in 1889